Sourabh Goho (Bengali: সৌরভ গোহো) is an Indian Tabla Player who performs Hindustani classical music and fusion music. He belongs to Farukhabad gharana. He is the son of renowned Harmonium Maestro, Pt. Jyoti Goho.

Early life
Sourabh was born in Kolkata, West Bengal to the Harmonium maestro, Pt. Jyoti Goho and Vocalist Mrs. Bandana Goho. He studied up to class XII (10+2) from The Future Foundation School, Kolkata. Thereafter he has completed his graduation in B.Com Accountancy Hons. from the Calcutta University. From 2014 to 2016 Sourabh is studying Master of Business Administration from The Heritage Business School, Kolkata. From his childhood days (age 07) Sourabh is taking talim from the Legendary Tabla Maestro Pandit Shankar Ghosh. He is also taking tabla lessons from maestro Pt. Bickram Ghosh.

Career
Sourabh started performing professionally in various concerts from the year 2009. He has played his international debut concert at Shanghai, China in 2013. He has played tabla solo concerts at various prestigious venues in Kolkata like - ITC Sangeet Research Academy, Ramakrishna Mission Institute of Culture Golpark, Bhowanipore Sangeet Sammilani and at All India Tabla Conference at Secunderabad (Telangana) among others. He played Jaaz Concert at India Habitat Center, New Delhi for American Institute of Indian Studies, World Music Concert at The Oberoi, New Delhi. In 2015 he has played classical concerts in India Habitat Center (New Delhi), Epicenter (Gurgaon) and Rabindra Sadan (Kolkata) among others. Sourabh conducted a tabla workshop at Mathieson Music School, Kolkata. In November 2014 he accompanied his father Pt. Jyoti Goho in his Harmonium solo concert at Indore, Madhya Pradesh.

References

External links
Official Website

Living people
Indian male classical musicians
1991 births
Bengali Hindus
Musicians from Kolkata